Vigor or  Kracht  is a 1990 Dutch drama film directed by Frouke Fokkema.

Cast
Theu Boermans	 ... 	Bert
Anneke Blok	... 	Roos
Dave van Dinther	... 	Thomas
Khaldoun Elmecky	... 	Jeu
Bert Geurkink	... 	Jo
Jaap Spijkers	... 	Slager
Marisa Van Eyle	... 	Slagersvrouw
Ivo Jacobs	... 	Slagerszoon
Rogier Gerardu	... 	Slagerszoon
Mieke Verheyden	... 	Moeder
Marieke Heebink	... 	Maria
Eelco Vellema	... 	Hubert
Dea Koert	... 	Marie-Louise
Myranda Jongeling	... 	Marktvrouw
Rik Launspach	... 	Sjors

External links 
 

1990 films
1990s Dutch-language films
1990 drama films
Dutch drama films